Rendezvous with Dishonour is a 1970 drama film directed by Adriano Bolzoni and starring Michael Craig.

Cast
 Michael Craig as Colonel Stephen Mallory
 Eva Renzi as Helena
 Adolfo Celi as Hermes
 Klaus Kinski as Evagoras
 George Sanders as General Downes
 Margaret Lee as Nikki
 Ennio Balbo as Chief of Turkish Police
 Giacomo Rossi-Stuart as Lt. Tibbitt
 Giuseppe Addobbati as Pappyanakis
 Mario Novelli as Yani
 Luciano Pigozzi as Mr. Anton
 Alessandro Momo as Alexander
 Rista Djordjevic as Priest
 John Stacy as Colonel Webb (as John Stacey)
 Silvia Faver as Molly
 Rachael Griffiths as Sylvia

See also
 The High Bright Sun (1964)

References

External links
 

1970 films
1970s thriller drama films
Italian thriller drama films
West German films
Yugoslav drama films
1970s Italian-language films
1970s English-language films
English-language Italian films
English-language German films
English-language Yugoslav films
Films set in Cyprus
Political thriller films
Films set in 1956
Films scored by Gianni Ferrio
1970 drama films
1970s Italian films